The triple jump at the Summer Olympics is grouped among the four track and field jumping events held at the multi-sport event. The men's triple jump has been present on the Olympic athletics programme since the first Summer Olympics in 1896. The women's triple jump is one of the more recent additions to the programme, having been first contested in 1996. It became the third Olympic jumping event for women after the high jump and long jump.

The men's triple jump world record was broken at the competition in 1924, 1932, 1936, 1956 and 1968. At the 1968 Summer Olympics, three men improved the record a total of five times at the high altitude of Mexico City. The women's world record was broken at the Olympics in Tokyo in 2021.

James Brendan Connolly was the first Olympic triple jump champion and, as it was the first event to conclude in 1896, he was also the first Olympic champion of the modern era. Inessa Kravets, the world record holder, became the first women's champion 100 years later at the Atlanta Games. Portuguese Pedro Pichardo and Venezuelan Yulimar Rojas are the reigning Olympic champions from 2020.

Viktor Saneyev is the event's most successful athlete as he was Olympic champion three times consecutively from 1968 to 1976, as well as runner-up in 1980. Françoise Mbango Etone is the only woman to win two Olympic triple jump titles. Saneyev, Vilho Tuulos and Tatyana Lebedeva are the only three athletes to have won more than two Olympic medals in the event. The United States is the most successful nation in the event, with eight gold medals. The Soviet Union is the next most successful, with four golds.

A short-lived standing triple jump variant of the event was contested in 1900 and 1904 and standing jumps specialist Ray Ewry won both gold medals.

Medalists

Men

Multiple medalists

Medalists by country

Women

Multiple medalists

Medalists by country

Standing triple jump

In 1900 and 1904 a variation of the event was contested at the Olympics where athletes had to triple jump from a standing position. This was one of three standing jumps to have featured on the Olympic programme, alongside the standing high jump and the standing long jump (both running from 1900 to 1912).

The standing jump competitions were dominated by Ray Ewry, who won the 1900 Olympic standing triple jump title and defended it four years later. Ewry took Olympic three gold medals in standing jumps in both 1900 and 1904, then won the standing high and long jumps at the 1908 Olympics, as well as the 1906 Intercalated Games.

Standing jump events had been a relatively common type of athletics event at the end of the 19th century, but became increasingly rare at top level national and international competitions as the 20th century progressed. The standing triple jump was the least common of the standing jumps and the Olympics remains the only major international competition to have featured the event.

References
Participation and athlete data
Athletics Men's Triple Jump Medalists. Sports Reference. Retrieved on 2014-05-03.
Athletics Women's Triple Jump Medalists. Sports Reference. Retrieved on 2014-05-03.
Olympic record progressions
Mallon, Bill (2012). TRACK & FIELD ATHLETICS - OLYMPIC RECORD PROGRESSIONS. Track and Field News. Retrieved on 2014-05-03.
Specific

External links
IAAF triple jump homepage
Official Olympics website
Olympic athletics records from Track & Field News

 
Olympics
Triple jump